A flying ace or fighter ace is a military aviator credited with shooting down five or more enemy aircraft during aerial combat. German day and night fighter pilots claimed roughly 70,000 aerial victories during World War II, 25,000 over British or American and 45,000 over Soviet flown aircraft. 103 German fighter pilots shot down more than 100 enemy aircraft for a total of roughly 15,400 aerial victories. Roughly a further 360 pilots claimed between 40 and 100 aerial victories for round about 21,000 victories. Another 500 fighter pilots claimed between 20 and 40 victories for a total of 15,000 victories. According to Obermeier, it is relatively certain, that 2,500 German fighter pilots attained ace status, having achieved at least 5 aerial victories. 453 German day and Zerstörer (destroyer) pilots received the Knight's Cross of the Iron Cross. 85 night fighter pilots, including 14 crew members, were awarded the Knight's Cross of the Iron Cross. The list is sorted by the number of aerial victories claimed at night.

Due to the worsening war situation for Germany and Luftwaffe policies, night fighter aces remained in frontline roles until they were killed or wounded in combat or no longer capable of flying due to exhaustion.

German night fighter aces

Notes

References

Citations

Bibliography

 
 
 
 
 
 

Germany night fighter aces
Fly

Night fighter aces